Sharaf Eldin Shaiboub Ali Abdelrahman (born 7 June 1994) is a Sudanese footballer who plays for the Sudan national football team.

Club career
On 14 September, Sharaf Shibun joined to CS Constantine for two seasons, coming from Simba Sports Club. Shibun the second Sudanese international to play in the Algerian Ligue Professionnelle 1 after compatriot Mohamed Abderrahmane Al Ghorbal. On 24 October, it was presented to the audience.

International career

Career statistics

Club

Honours

Club
 Al-Merrikh SC 
 Sudan Premier League (1): 2015
 Sudan Cup (2): 2014, 2015
 Al-Hilal Club
 Sudan Premier League (2): 2016, 2017
 Sudan Cup (1): 2016
 Simba SC 
 Tanzanian Premier League (1): 2019-20
 Tanzanian Cup (1): 2019-20

References

External links

1994 births
Living people
Sudanese footballers
Association football midfielders
Al-Hilal Club (Omdurman) players
JS Kairouan players
Al-Merrikh SC players
Sudan international footballers